Minudasht County is in Golestan province, Iran. The capital of the county is the city of Minudasht. At the 2006 census, the county's population was 126,676, in 30,791 households. The following census in 2011 counted 75,659 people in 20,852 households, by which time Galikash District had been separated from the county to form Galikash County. At the 2016 census, the county's population was 75,483 in 22,719 households.

Administrative divisions

The population history and structural changes of Minudasht County's administrative divisions over three consecutive censuses are shown in the following table. The latest census shows two districts, four rural districts, and one city.

References

 

Counties of Golestan Province